The Dasu Dam is a large hydroelectric gravity dam currently under construction on the Indus River near Dasu in Kohistan District, Khyber Pakhtunkhwa Province, Pakistan. It is developed by Pakistan Water and Power Development Authority (Wapda), as a key component of the company's Water Vision 2025. The project was started in 2019 but faced a delay due to funds and land acquisition disputes. Work resumed in 2020 after land acquisition and arrangements of funding facility, the World Bank agreed to contributed $700 million of the $4.2 billion as the government of Imran Khan decided to proceed ahead with the construction of the project, as part of his vision of reducing Pakistan's reliance on non-renewable energy.

The plant is expected to start generating power in late 2024, and stage I is planned to complete by early 2025.

Timeline 
Dasu dam proposal was approved in 2001, as part of Government of Pakistan’s Vision 2025 program. Feasibility study was completed in 2009.

The first stage was approved by the Executive Committee of the National Economic Council on 29 March 2014. It will cost an estimated $4.278 billion. Former Prime Minister Nawaz Sharif attended the dam's groundbreaking ceremony on 25 June 2014. 

Contracts for preparatory works of the project were awarded in the first half of 2015, and early construction works actually started in June 2017.

The main civil works, undertaken by China Gezhouba Group Company Limited, started in February 2018. Work on the water diversion tunnel was inaugurated December 2018.

In November 2019, WAPDA signed a first Rs52.5 billion contract with a Chinese joint-venture, regarding electro-mechanical works. This contract includes design, supply and installation of the first stage's six 360 MW turbines, along with their generators, and transformers.

As of December 2020, construction activities on the Main Civil Works (02 diversion tunnels, underground powerhouse, access tunnels), Right Bank Access Road, the relocation of Karakoram Highway, Project Colony, 132 kV transmission line, and Resettlement Sites for affected people are underway.

Funding 
The project cost was revised from an initial Rs486.093 billion to Rs510.980 billion, mainly because of escalation of land cost.

Project is being financed by the World Bank (US$588 million), the Local Commercial financing from a consortium of Local Banks (Rs144 billion), and Foreign Commercial financing from Credit Suisse Bank ($350 million). WAPDA will also inject its equity equivalent to 15% of the project base cost.

On 1 April 2020, World Bank approved an additional $700 million in the financing, with the funds to be used for the 765 kV transmission line that will complete the first 2,160 MW phase of the project on the Indus River.

Worker's bus incident

References

Dams under construction
Dams in Pakistan
Hydroelectric power stations in Pakistan
Kohistan District, Pakistan
Gravity dams
Dams on the Indus River
Roller-compacted concrete dams